Rohan Bopanna and Aisam-ul-Haq Qureshi were the defending champions but Bopanna decided not to participate.
Qureshi plays alongside Jean-Julien Rojer and won the title beating Treat Conrad Huey and Scott Lipsky in the final, 6–3, 6–4.

Seeds

Draw

Draw

References
 Main Draw

2012 Gerry Weber Open